Neon Gold Records is a New York City-based boutique record label founded in 2008 by Derek Davies and Lizzy Plapinger.

Initially operating as a vinyl-only singles label, Neon Gold has launched the debut releases and international careers of many acts including Passion Pit, Ellie Goulding, Marina, Gotye, Christine & The Queens, Charli XCX, Matt Maeson, and Tove Lo. Beyond their own roster, Neon Gold are often credited with the discovery and initial support of a number of other successful artists including Vampire Weekend, Lana Del Rey, CHVRCHES, Grouplove, and Walk the Moon.

Since 2014 Neon Gold has operated as a subsidiary of Atlantic Records.

History
On 8 December 2010, Neon Gold signed a joint venture with Columbia Records which enabled them to graduate to full-length releases through Columbia and RED Distribution Through the venture with Columbia, the label signed and released debut albums from St. Lucia, HAIM, and Magic Man.

In January 2014, the label embarked on a new venture with Atlantic Records which was Charli XCX's sophomore record release through Neon Gold/Atlantic in the fall. The deal made Neon Gold an imprint label under Atlantic–co-chaired by Julie Greenwald and Craig Kallman, who oversaw similar Atlantic imprints Fueled By Ramen and Canvasback.

Neon Gold Live
Neon Gold also runs a successful promotions arm, operating popular monthly club nights in New York City, London, and Los Angeles; they produce approximately 100 events a year in addition to their flagship annual showcases at South by Southwest, CMJ and The Great Escape Festival.

Launched at Tammany Hall in New York City's Lower East Side in 2011, the monthly club night Popshop is the primary outlet of the Neon Gold Live operation, and has since expanded to new venues and cities.

As of 2020, Neon Gold hosts monthly events in the following cities:
New York – Popshop NYC at Baby's All Right
Los Angeles – Popshop West at  Moroccan Lounge

Artists

Current
Broods
Joe P
Charli XCX
Christine and the Queens
Jax Anderson
Matt Maeson
Winona Oak
Jax Anderson
Oscar and the Wolf
SNOW CULTURE
St. Lucia
The Knocks
Tigertown
Tove Lo
Your Smith

Past
Alex Winston
ANR
ASTR
Cathedrals
Ellie Goulding
Fort Lean
Foxes
Gotye
Great Good Fine OK
HAERTS
Haim
Icona Pop
Jessica Morgan
Little Red
Lovelife
Magic Man
MARINA
Miami Horror
Mille Ponken
Monarchy
Monica Birkenes
MØ
Passion Pit
Penguin Prison
Polarsets
POP ETC
Ryn Weaver
Savoir Adore
Seinabo Sey
Sir Sly
Starsmith
Strange Talk
The Naked and Famous
The Sound of Arrows
Wet
Wildcat! Wildcat!

See also
 Frenchkiss Records
 XL Recordings

References

External links
 Neon Gold blog
 Neon Gold on MySpace
 Neon Gold on Billboard Biz

Record labels established in 2008
Atlantic Records